This is a list of British units which took part in the American Revolutionary War (1775–1783), fighting against the American rebels and their French, Spanish and Dutch allies in the thirteen North American colonies, including battles in Florida and the West Indies. In addition to the regular army the list includes German auxiliary units (known collectively as Hessians), and militia and provincial units formed from Loyalists, West Indians, and Canadians.

No battle honours were ever awarded to British regiments who fought in America as it was seen by the British to be a civil war. Four battle honours were, however, awarded for actions against the French and Spanish in the West Indies and other theatres.

Of the British Army regiments raised during the war, primarily for military service in North America or the Caribbean, only three, the 23rd Light Dragoons and the 73rd and 78th Foot, survived the post-war reductions in the Army. The 23rd Light Dragoons (later the 19th Light Dragoons) served in India until 1806; the 73rd (renumbered 71st in 1786) later became part of the Highland Light Infantry while the 78th (renumbered 72nd in 1786) became part of the Seaforth Highlanders (Ross-shire Buffs) in 1881.

The newly raised 85th Foot, 86th Foot, 87th Foot, 88th Foot, 89th Foot, 90th Foot, 91st Foot, 92nd Foot, 93rd Foot, 94th Foot and 99th Foot were stationed on garrison duty in the West Indies. All were disbanded at the end of the war.

Infantry units which remained in the British Isles during the war included the 2nd Foot (Queen's Royal Regiment (West Surrey)), the 11th Foot (Devonshires), the 12th Foot (Suffolk), the 25th Foot (King's Own Scottish Borderers) at Sussex, the 32nd Foot at Cornwall, the 36th Foot at Herefordshire, the 39th Foot at East Middlesex, the 41st Foot, the 51st Foot and the 81st Foot.

The 78th Foot, the 83rd Foot and the 95th Foot were stationed in Jersey, where they defeated a French invasion of the island in 1781 (the Battle of Jersey). Other regiments were in service in India or Gibraltar.

British Regular Army

Artillery

 Royal Regiment of Artillery
 4th Battalion (battalion raised and based in the Americas)
 Royal Irish Regiment of Artillery (did not fight as a unit, but as drafts for British forces)

Cavalry
 16th The Queen's Lancers a.k.a. the 16th (or The Queen's) Regiment of (Light) Dragoons
 17th Regiment of (Light) Dragoons

Infantry

Foot Guards
Brigade of Guards (raised from drafts of 1st Regiment of Foot Guards, Coldstream Regiment of Foot Guards, and 3rd Regiment of Foot Guards)
 1st Battalion
 2nd Battalion

Line Infantry
 British Regulars
 1st (Royal) Regiment of Foot
 3rd Regiment of Foot or "Buffs" and "Royal East Kent Regiment"
 4th (The King's Own) (Lancaster) Regiment of Foot
 5th Regiment of Foot (Royal Northumberland Fusiliers)
 6th Regiment of Foot (Royal Warwickshire Regiment)
 7th Regiment of Foot (Royal Fusiliers)
 8th (The King's) Regiment of Foot
 9th Regiment of Foot (East Norfolk Regiment)
 10th Regiment of Foot (Royal Lincolnshire Regiment)
 13th Regiment of Foot (Prince Albert's) (Somerset Light Infantry)
 14th Regiment of Foot (Prince of Wales's Own) (West Yorkshire Regiment)
 15th Regiment of Foot (Sir William Clifton's Regiment of Foot) (East Yorkshire Regiment)
 16th Regiment of Foot
 17th Regiment of Foot
 18th (or Royal Irish) Regiment of Foot
 19th Regiment of Foot
 20th Regiment of Foot
 21st Regiment of Foot (Royal North British Fusiliers)
 22nd Regiment of Foot (Cheshire Regiment)
 23rd Regiment of Foot (Royal Welch Fusiliers)
 24th Regiment of Foot
 26th Regiment of Foot
 27th (Enniskillen) Regiment of Foot
 28th Regiment of Foot
 29th Regiment of Foot
 30th Regiment of Foot
 31st Regiment of Foot
 33rd Regiment of Foot
 34th Regiment of Foot
 35th Regiment of Foot
 37th Regiment of Foot
 38th Regiment of Foot
 40th Regiment of Foot
 42nd (Royal Highland) Regiment of Foot
 43rd Regiment of Foot
 44th Regiment of Foot
 45th Regiment of Foot
 46th Regiment of Foot
 47th Regiment of Foot
 48th Regiment of Foot
 49th Regiment of Foot
 50th Regiment of Foot
 52nd Regiment of Foot
 53rd Regiment of Foot
 54th Regiment of Foot
 55th Regiment of Foot
 57th Regiment of Foot
 59th Regiment of Foot
 60th (Royal American) Regiment of Foot
 62nd Regiment of Foot
 63rd Regiment of Foot
 64th Regiment of Foot
 65th Regiment of Foot
 69th Regiment of Foot
 70th Regiment of Foot (Glasgow Lowland)
 71st Regiment of Foot (Frasers Highlanders)
 74th Regiment of (Highland) Foot
 76th Regiment of Foot (Macdonald's Highlanders)
 79th Regiment of Foot (Royal Liverpool Volunteers)
 80th Regiment of Foot (Royal Edinburgh Volunteers)
 82nd Regiment of Foot (1777)
 83rd Regiment of Foot (Royal Glasgow Volunteers)
 84th Regiment of Foot (Royal Highland Emigrants) (Loyalist)
 105th Regiment of Foot, (ex Volunteers of Ireland)
 110th Regiment of Foot, (ex King's American Regiment)
Regiments stationed in the West Indies
 85th Regiment of Foot (Westminster Volunteers)
 86th Regiment of Foot (Rutland Regiment)
 87th Regiment of Foot (1779)
 88th Regiment of Foot (1779)
 89th Regiment of Foot (1779)
 90th Regiment of Foot (Yorkshire Volunteers)
 91st Regiment of Foot (Shropshire Volunteers)
 92nd Regiment of Foot (1779)
 93rd Regiment of Foot (1780)
 94th Regiment of Foot (1780)
 99th Regiment of Foot (Jamaica Regiment)

H.M. Marine Forces
 1st Battalion
 2nd Battalion

American establishment
 1st American Regiment (formerly the Queen's Rangers) (1756–1783)
 2nd American Regiment (formerly the Volunteers of Ireland, placed on British establishment, in 1782, as 105th Regiment of Foot) (1778-1784)
 3rd American Regiment (formerly the New York Volunteers) (1776-1783)
 4th American Regiment (formerly the King's American Regiment, placed on British establishment, in 1782, possibly as the 110th Regiment of Foot) (1776-1783)
 5th American Regiment (formerly the British Legion, placed on British establishment, in 1782, as Tarleton's Dragoons) (1777-1782)

American Loyalist units

Provincial Corps

 American Legion (1780–1783)
 American Volunteers (1779–1780)
 Armed Boat Company (1781–1783)
 Black Company of Pioneers (also, known as the Black Pioneers, later merged into the Guides and Pioneers in 1778), (pioneers, another name for military construction engineers) (1777–1778)
 British Legion (placed on American establishment in 1781 as 5th American Regiment) (1777–1778)
 Bucks County Dragoons (absorbed by British Legion in 1780) (1778–1780)
 Butler's Rangers (1777–1784)
 Caledonian Volunteers (formed part of the British Legion in 1778) (1777–1778)
 Campbell's Dragoons (South Carolina Dragoons) (1781)
 Canadian Companies (1777–1783)
 Claus' Rangers (1775–1783)
 Collett's Independent Company (1777)
 De Lancey's Brigade (1776–1783)
 Detroit Volunteers (claimed descent from Roger's Rangers, later became 1st Battalion 119th Field Artillery Regiment, Michigan National Guard) (1778–1783)
 Diemar's Troop of Black Hussars (also, known as Diemar's Hussars and Black Hussars), hussars, (light cavalry) (1779–1781)
 Duke of Cumberland's Regiment (1781–1783)
 Duchess County Company (1776–1777)
 Emmerich's Chasseurs (chasseurs / light cavalry) (1777–1779)
 Fenwick's Dragoons (South Carolina Dragoons) (1781)
 Forshner's Independent Company (1780–1781)
 Georgia Light Dragoons (there was also, a Local Volunteer Corps unit, of the same name) (1779–1781)
 Georgia Loyalists (1779–1782)
 Governor Wentworth's Volunteers (1777–1781)
 Guides and Pioneers (absorbed the Black Company of Pioneers in 1778) (1778–1783)
 Harkimer's Batteau Company (1780–1783)
 Hierlihy's Corps
 James Island Light Dragoons
 King's American Dragoons
 King's American Regiment (placed on American establishment, in 1781, as 4th American Regiment, part of the regular, British Army) (1776–1783)
 King's Rangers
 King's (Carolina) Rangers
 King's Orange Rangers
 King's Royal Regiment of New York
 Kinloch's Light Dragoons (formed part of the British Legion in 1778)
 Locke's Independent Company
 Loyal American Rangers (1780–1783)
 Loyal American Regiment
 Loyal Foresters
 Loyal New Englanders
 Loyal Rangers
 Loyal Rhode Islanders
 Maryland Loyalists Battalion
 McAlpin's Corps (also, known as McAlpin's Corps of Royalists, absorbed the American Volunteers, King’s Loyal Americans, Queen’s Loyal Rangers, and Adams' Rangers)
 Nassau Blues
 Newfoundland Regiment (placed on British establishment in 1782)
 New Hampshire Volunteers
 New Jersey Volunteers (Skinner's Greens)
 Newport Artillery Company (Rhode Island) 1741
 New York Volunteers (placed on American establishment, as 3rd American Regiment in 1779)
 North Carolina Highlanders
 North Carolina Independent Company
 North Carolina Independent Dragoons
 Pennsylvania Loyalists
 Philadelphia Light Dragoons (formed part of the British Legion in 1778)
 Prince of Wales's American Volunteers
 Provincial Light Infantry
 Queen's Rangers (placed on American establishment, in 1779, as 1st American Regiment, descended from Roger's Rangers)
 Roman Catholic Volunteers (1777–1778)
 Royal American Reformers
 Royal Fencible Americans
 Royal Garrison Battalion (placed on British establishment in 178
 Royal Georgia Volunteers
 Royal Highland Emigrants (placed on British establishment in 1779 as 84th Foot)
 Royal Nova Scotia Volunteer Regiment
 Saint John's Volunteers
 Starkloff's Dragoons (South Carolina Dragoons) (1781)
 South Carolina Rangers
 South Carolina Royalists
 Stewart's Troop of Light Dragoons
 Van Alstine's Batteau Company
 Volunteers of Ireland (absorbed the Roman Catholic Volunteers and New Jersey Volunteers and placed on American establishment, in 1779, as 2nd American Regiment, part of the regular, British Army) (1778–1782)
 Volunteers of New England
 West Florida Royal Foresters
 West Jersey Volunteers

Militia

 Charleston Militia (1780–1782)
 Charleston Volunteer Battalion (1780–1782)
 Detroit Militia (1775–1784)
 East Florida Militia (1776–1783)
 Georgia Artillery (1781–1782)
 Georgia Militia (1779–1782)
 German Independent Company, (part of New York City Militia) (1776–?)
 Independent Troop of Black Dragoons (also, known as Black Pioneer Troop) (1782)
 Loyal Commissariat Volunteers (1779–1782)
 Loyal Ordnance Volunteers (1780)
 Loyal Volunteers of the City of New York (also, known as New York City Militia) (1776–1783)
 Massachusetts Militia (1775–1783)
 Massachusetts Volunteers (1777–1783)
 McDonald's Company of Volunteers (1778)
 Minorca Volunteer Company (part of East Florida Militia) (1777–?)
 New Jersey Militia (1776–1777)
 New York City Militia (1776–1783)
 New York Independent Highland Volunteers (1776–1783)
 New York Marine Artillery Company (1780–1783)
 New York Militia (1776–1783)
 New York Rangers (1776–1783)
 North Carolina Militia (1781–1782)
 Nova Scotia Militia (1775–1784)
 Nova Scotia Volunteer Militia Regiment (1776–1781)
 Quebec City Militia (1775–1783)
 Quebec Militia (1775–1783)
 Saint Johns County Volunteers (1781)
 South Carolina Militia (1775–1782)
 South Carolina Volunteers (1781–1782)
 Westchester Chasseurs (chasseurs (light cavalry) (1777)
 West Florida Militia (1778–1781)

Local Volunteer Corps

 Adams Company of Rangers (also, known as Adams' Rangers) (1777–1780)
 Bay Fusiliers (also, known as Mosquito Shore Volunteers and Black River Volunteers) (1779–?)
 Bucks County Volunteers (1778–1783)
 Detroit Volunteers (1778–1783)
 Dunlop's Corps (1780–1781)
 East Florida Rangers (1776–1779)
 East Florida Volunteers (1777–1780)
 Ethiopian Regiment (1775–1776)
 Georgia Light Dragoons (there was also, a Provincial Corps unit, of the same name) (1781–1782) 
 Georgia Rangers (1773–1776)
 Georgia Rifle Dragoons (1779)
 King's Dock Yard Volunteers (1780)
 King's Loyal Americans (1776–1781)
 Loyal Volunteers of the City of New York, under the command of Mayor David Mathews
 Mackay's Corps (also, known as Mackay’s Corps of Royalists, Pfister's Corps of Royalists, and Leake's Corps of Royalists) (1777–1781)
 Mayor's Independent Company of Volunteers of New York City under the command of Loyalist Mayor David Mathews
 McAlpin's Corps of Royalists (also, known as McAlpin's Corps and American Volunteers) (1777–1781)
 Mosquito Shore Volunteers (also, known as Bay Fusiliers and Black River Volunteers) (1779–?)
 Natchez Volunteers (1781)
 Negro Volunteers (1779)
 Newfoundland Volunteers (1779–1980)
 North Carolina Volunteers (1776)
 Queen's Loyal Rangers (1777–1781)
 Queen's Loyal Virginia Regiment (absorbed by Queen's Rangers in 1776) (1776–1783)
 Queen's Royal Rangers (1775–1776)
 Rattan and Black River Volunteers (1780–1781)
 Royal Bateaux Volunteers (bateau|batteux) (1779–1781)
 Royal Ethiopian Regiment (disbanded) (1775–1776)
 Virginia Light Horse (1776)
 Virginia Volunteers (1781)
 Volunteers of Augusta (1781–1782)
 West Florida Provincials (1778–1781)
 West Florida Refugees (1777–1781)

Associators and Refugees

 Associated Loyalists (1780–1782)
 Black Brigade (Black Loyalists) (1779–1783)
 Brant's Volunteers (1777–1779)
 De Lancey's Refugees (1776–1783)
 Hatfield's Company of Partisans (partisan irregulars) (1779–1782)
 Hazard's Corps of Refugees (1780–1782)
 James Stewart's Company of Refugees (1780–1781)
 King's Militia Volunteers (1779–1780)
 Loyal American Association (1775–1776)
 Loyal Associated Refugees (1779)
 Loyal Irish Volunteers (1775–1776)
 Loyal Newport Associators (1777–1779)
 Loyal Refugee Volunteers (1779–1782)
 Maryland Royal Retaliators (1780–1781)
 Pepperell's Corps (1779–?)
 Robins Company of Partisans (partisan irregulars) (1780–1782?)
 Royal North British Volunteers (1775–1776)
 Sharp's Refugee Marines (marines - naval-based infantry force) (1779)
 Uzal Ward's Company of Refugees (1780–1783)

West Indian Forces

 Barbados Militia
 Barbadian Rangers (1781–1783)
 Black Carolina Corps
 Grenada Militia (1775–1779)
 Jamaica Corps of Foot (also, known as the Jamaica Corps and Amherst’s Corps) (1781–1783)
 Independent Companies (Jamaica)
 Jamaica Legion (absorbed by Jamaica Volunteers in 1780) (1780)
 Jamaica Light Dragoons (1780–1781)
 Jamaica Militia (1780–1781)
 Jamaica Rangers (1779–1783)
 Jamaica Volunteers (absorbed the Jamaica Legion, after 1780) (1779–1781)
 Turks Island Company (1781–1783)

German Auxiliaries

Principality of Anhalt-Zerbst
 Rauschenplatt's Princess of Anhalt-Zerbst's Regiment (2 battalions, 1 infantry in Quebec (1778), and 1 "Pandour" in New York (1780))
 Nuppenau's Jäger Company
 Company of Artillery

Margrave of Ansbach and Bayreuth
 1st Regiment Anspach (later Regiment von Volt; 1st Anspach Battalion)
 2nd Regiment Bayreuth (later Regiment Seybothen; 2nd Anspach Battalion)
 Anspach Jäger Company

Duchy of Brunswick

 Dragoon Regiment Prinz Lüdwig Ernst
 Grenadier Battalion Breymann
 Light Infantry Battalion von Barner
 Musketeer Regiment Riedesel
 Musketeer Regiment Specht
 Regiment Prinz Friedrich
 Regiment von Rhetz
 von Geyso's Jäger Company

Electorate of Hanover
 1st Battalion von Reden
 1st Battalion von Hardenberg
 1st Battalion la Motte
 2nd Battalion Prinz Ernst von Mecklenburg
 2nd Battalion von Goldacker
 14th Regiment
 15th Regiment

Landgrave of Hesse-Kassel (or Hesse-Cassel)
 Combined Regiment von Loos
 Fusilier Regiment von Dittfurth
 Fusilier Regiment Erbprinz (later Musketeer Regiment (1780))
 Fusilier Regiment von Knyphausen
 Fusilier Regiment von Lossburg
 Grenadier Regiment von Rall (later von Woellwarth (1777); von Trümbach (1779); d'Angelelli (1781))
 1st Battalion Grenadiers von Linsing
 2nd Battalion Grenadiers von Block (later von Lengerke)
 3rd Battalion Grenadiers von Minnigerode (later von Loewenstein)
 4th Battalion Grenadiers von Koehler (later von Graff; von Platte)
 Garrison Regiment von Bünau
 Garrison Regiment von Huyne (later von Benning)
 Garrison Regiment von Stein (later von Seitz; von Porbeck)
 Garrison Regiment von Wissenbach (later von Knoblauch)
 Jäger Corps
 Leib Infantry Regiment
 Musketeer Regiment von Donop
 Musketeer Regiment von Trümbach (later Von Bose (1779))
 Musketeer Regiment von Mirbach (later Jung von Lossburg (1780))
 Musketeer Regiment Prinz Carl
 Musketeer Regiment von Wutginau (later Landgraf (1777))

County of Hesse-Hanau

 Janecke's Frei Corps of Light Infantry
 Musketeer Regiment Erbprinz
 Creuzbourg's Jäger Corps
 Pausch's Company of Artillery

Principality of Waldeck
 3rd Waldeck Regiment

See also

 British Army during the American War of Independence
 List of Regiments of Foot
 List of British Army regiments (1881)
 List of Continental Forces in the American Revolutionary War

References

 Baer, Friederike. Hessians: German Soldiers in the American Revolutionary War (Oxford University Press, 2022). Website. .
 Katcher, Philip, Encyclopaedia of British, Provincial and German Army Units 1775–1783, 1973, 
 History of Hanoverian troops in Gibraltar: Minorca and the East Indies (in German)
 List of British Loyalist Regiments - The On-Line Institute for Advanced Loyalist Studies
 Regiments.org
 Revwar75 - Crown Forces
 the King's Own Patriots
 The Hessians in the Revolution

Specific

External links
 Select Bibliography of British Participation in the American Revolutionary War compiled by the United States Army Center of Military History
 The Brigade of the American Revolution (BAR), Recreated British and Allied military units (Living History)
 The Northwest Territory Alliance (NWTA), Recreated British and Allied military units (Living History)

British units
American Revolutionary War

18th-century history of the British Army